The River Camcor is a tributary of the Little Brosna River in central Ireland. It joins the Little Brosna in the Birr Castle Desmesne, Birr, County Offaly. The Little Brosna, in turn, joins the River Shannon close to Victoria Lock at Meelick.

See also
Rivers of Ireland

References

Rivers of County Offaly